East River Drive is an album by jazz fusion bassist Stanley Clarke that was released in 1993.

Track listing

Source:

Personnel

 Stanley Clarke – bass, tenor bass, background vocals
 Gerald Albright – alto and soprano saxophones
 George Howard – bass, soprano saxophone
 Doug Webb – soprano saxophone
 Todd Cochran – keyboards
 George Duke – keyboards
 Steve Hunt – keyboards
 Deron Johnson – keyboards
 Kenny Kirkland – piano
 Doc Powell – guitar
 Paul Jackson Jr. – guitar
 Armand Sabal-Lecco – guitar, piccolo bass, background vocals
 Michael Thompson – guitar
 Hubert Laws – flute
 Jean-Luc Ponty – violin
 Poncho Sanchez – conga
 Alphonso Johnson – bass
 Abraham Laboriel – bass
 Charles Fambrough – double bass
 Jimmy Earl – bass
 Ramon Banda – percussion
 Darryl Jackson – percussion
 Munyungo Jackson – percussion
 Bill Summers – percussion
 Gerry Brown – drums
 Dennis Chambers – drums
 John Robinson – drums
 Carlos Vega – drums
 Howard Hewett – vocals
 Alexis England – background vocals
 Laura Robinson – background vocals
 Anjani Thomas – background vocals

Source:

Production
 George DelBarrio  – conductor, string arrangements
 Brian Gardner – mastering
 Dan Humann – engineer, mixing
 Allen Sides – engineer
 Steve Sykes – engineer, mixing

References

1993 albums
Stanley Clarke albums
Epic Records albums
Albums produced by Stanley Clarke
Smooth jazz albums